Franck Ducheix (born 11 April 1962) is a French fencer. He won a silver medal in the team sabre at the 1984 Summer Olympics and a bronze in the same event at the 1992 Summer Olympics.

References

External links
 

1962 births
Living people
French male sabre fencers
Olympic fencers of France
Fencers at the 1984 Summer Olympics
Fencers at the 1988 Summer Olympics
Fencers at the 1992 Summer Olympics
Fencers at the 1996 Summer Olympics
Olympic silver medalists for France
Olympic bronze medalists for France
Olympic medalists in fencing
Sportspeople from Oran
Pieds-Noirs
Medalists at the 1984 Summer Olympics
Medalists at the 1992 Summer Olympics
20th-century French people